The men's Greco-Roman featherweight competition at the 1964 Summer Olympics in Tokyo took place from 16 to 19 October at the Komazawa Gymnasium. Nations were limited to one competitor.

Competition format

This Greco-Roman wrestling competition continued to use the "bad points" elimination system introduced at the 1928 Summer Olympics for Greco-Roman and at the 1932 Summer Olympics for freestyle wrestling, as adjusted at the 1960 Summer Olympics. Each bout awarded 4 points. If the victory was by fall, the winner received 0 and the loser 4. If the victory was by decision, the winner received 1 and the loser 3. If the bout was tied, each wrestler received 2 points. A wrestler who accumulated 6 or more points was eliminated. Rounds continued until there were 3 or fewer uneliminated wrestlers. If only 1 wrestler remained, he received the gold medal. If 2 wrestlers remained, point totals were ignored and they faced each other for gold and silver (if they had already wrestled each other, that result was used). If 3 wrestlers remained, point totals were ignored and a round-robin was held among those 3 to determine medals (with previous head-to-head results, if any, counting for this round-robin).

Results

Round 1

 Bouts

 Points

Round 2

The field was narrowed from 27 to 19 in round 2. Mewis was the only wrestler with 0 points.

 Bouts

 Points

Round 3

Only four of the 19 wrestlers were eliminated in this round, but 5 men had 5 points after the round. Lehtonen withdrew. Polyák took over the lead at 1 point after Mewis's loss.

 Bouts

 Points

Round 4

All 7 losers and 2 of the 7 winners were eliminated in this round. Polyák stayed at 1 point, while all 4 other wrestlers remaining had 3 points.

 Bouts

 Points

Round 5

Polyák had the bye. Both bouts featured two wrestlers with 3 points; winners would continue while losers would be out (ties would leave both men in competition). Martinović and Rurua won their bouts, advancing to the final round along with Polyák.

 Bouts

 Points

Final round

Martinović did not contest the final rounds, taking the bronze medal. Polyák and Rurua wrestled to a draw, with the gold medal going to the Hungarian based on the total points tie-breaker.

 Bouts

 Points

References

Wrestling at the 1964 Summer Olympics